Jean-François Ducis (22 August 173331 March 1816) was a  French dramatist and adapter of Shakespeare.

Biography 
Ducis was born in Versailles, one of ten children.
His father, Pierre Ducis, originally from Savoy, was a linen draper at Versailles, and his mother, Maria-Thérèse Rappe, was the daughter of a porter of the Count of Toulouse and all through life he retained the simple tastes and straightforward independence fostered by his bourgeois education.

In 1768, he produced his first tragedy, Amélise. The failure of this first attempt was fully compensated by the success of his Hamlet (1769), and Roméo et Juliette (1772). Œdipe chez Admète, imitated partly from Euripides and partly from Sophocles, appeared in 1778, and secured him in the following year the chair in the Academy left vacant by the death of Voltaire. Equally successful was Le Roi Lear in 1783. Macbeth in 1784 did not take so well, and Jean sans terre in 1791 was almost a failure; but Othello in 1792, supported by the acting of Talma, obtained immense applause.
Its vivid picturing of desert life secured for Abufar ou la Famille arabe (1795), an original drama, a flattering reception.

Ducis was noted for his translations of six of Shakespeare's plays and Ducis' adaptations, which frequently involved renaming characters and revising plots, became the basis for translations into Italian and the languages of Eastern Europe. As an example, Ducis version of Othello ended with the title character reconciling with Desdemona and pardoning a chastened Iago.

On the failure of a similar piece, Phédor et Waldamir, ou la famille de Sibérie (1801), Ducis ceased to write for the stage; and the rest of his life was spent in quiet retirement at Versailles.
He had been named a member of the Council of the Ancients in 1798, but he never discharged the functions of the office; and when Napoleon offered him a post of honor under the empire, he refused.
Amiable, religious and bucolic, he had little sympathy with the fierce, sceptical and tragic times in which his lot was cast. "Alas!" he said in the midst of the Revolution, "tragedy is abroad in the streets; if I step outside of my door, I have blood to my very ankles. I have too often seen Atreus in clogs, to venture to bring an Atreus on the stage."

Though actuated by honest admiration of the great English dramatist, Ducis is not Shakespearean. His ignorance of the English language left him at the mercy of the translations of Pierre Letourneur (1736–1788) and of Pierre de la Place (1707–1793); and even this modified Shakespeare had still to undergo a process of purification and correction before he could be presented to the fastidious criticism of French taste.
That such was the case was not, however, the fault of Ducis; and he did good service in modifying the judgment of his fellow countrymen.
He did not pretend to reproduce, but to excerpt and refashion; and consequently the French play sometimes differs from its English namesake in everything almost but the name.
The plot is different, the characters are different, the motif different, and the scenic arrangement different.
Le Banquet de l'amitié, a poem in four cantos (1771), Au roi de Sardaigne (1775), Discours de réception à l'académie française (1779), Épîtres à l'amitíé (1786), and a Recueil de poésies (1809), complete the list of Ducis's publications.

Works

Theatre plays 
 1760: Hamlet
 1772: Roméo et Juliette
 1778: Œdipe chez Admèle
 1783: Le roi Lear
 1784: Macbeth
 1791: Jean sans Terre
 1792: Othello
 1795: Abufard ou la Famille arabe
 1797: Œdipe à Colonne
 1801: Phédor et Waldamir

Poetry 
 1771: Le Banquet de l’amitié
 1809: Mélanges
 1813: Épîtres et poésies diverses
 1826: Œuvres posthumes (publiées par Vincent Campenon)

Correspondence 
 1836: Lettres à Talma, 1792-1815, publication posthume

Speeches 
1775: Au roi de Sardaigne, sur le mariage du prince de Piémont avec Mme Clotilde de France, 1775
1779: Discours de réception : Éloge de M. de Voltaire, 4 March
1822: Épître à Richard pendant ma convalescence, 28 November

Notes

References

External links 
 Jean-françois Ducis on data.bnf.fr

1733 births
1816 deaths
Writers from Versailles
18th-century French dramatists and playwrights
18th-century French poets
18th-century French male writers
Members of the Académie Française
Burials at the Cemetery of Saint-Louis, Versailles